Börde Lamstedt is a Samtgemeinde ("collective municipality") in the district of Cuxhaven, in Lower Saxony, Germany. It is situated approximately 35 km east of Bremerhaven, and 15 km north of Bremervörde. Its seat is in the village Lamstedt.

The Samtgemeinde Börde Lamstedt consists of the following municipalities:

 Armstorf 
 Hollnseth 
 Lamstedt
 Mittelstenahe
 Stinstedt

References

Samtgemeinden in Lower Saxony